Dendrobium longicornu, the long-horned dendrobium, is a species of orchid native to Asia.

It is native to southern China (Guangxi, Tibet, Yunnan), the Himalayas (Nepal, northeastern India, Bhutan, Bangladesh, Assam), and northern Indochina (Myanmar, Vietnam).

References

External links 
 
 

longicornu
Orchids of Asia
Flora of East Himalaya
Flora of Indo-China
Orchids of Bangladesh
Orchids of Myanmar
Orchids of China
Orchids of India
Orchids of Nepal
Orchids of Vietnam
Plants described in 1830